The United Kingdom selected their entry for the Eurovision Song Contest 1996 in Oslo, Norway with a new show, The Great British Song Contest. The winning entry was Gina G with "Ooh Aah... Just a Little Bit".

Before Eurovision

The Great British Song Contest 1996 
The Great British Song Contest 1996 was the national final developed by the BBC in order to select the British entry for the Eurovision Song Contest 1996. Eight acts competed in the competition which consisted of a semi-final on 1 March 1996 and a televised final on 8 March 1996. Both semi-final and final were broadcast on BBC1.

Semi-final
The qualifying round for the contest (the first since ), a special edition of Top of the Pops, was broadcast on BBC1 on 1 March 1996 and hosted by Nicky Campbell. It was announced that the four songs with the highest number of telephone votes would qualify for the final. A recap of the songs were also featured during the following morning's edition of  Live & Kicking with voting lines reopened for a short time. The top four songs were announced later that evening during The National Lottery Live and went forward to the final on 8 March.

{| class="sortable wikitable" style="margin: 1em auto 1em auto; text-align:center;"
|+ Semi-final1 March 1996
|-
! scope="col" | Draw
! scope="col" | Artist
! scope="col" | Song
! scope="col" | Songwriter(s)
! scope="col" | Result
|- style="font-weight:bold; background:#FFDEAD;"
| 1
| style="text-align:left;" | Layla
| style="text-align:left;" | "Find Love"
| style="text-align:left;" | Marcus Vere, Simon Wilkinson
| Advanced'|- style="font-weight:bold; background:#FFDEAD;"
| 2
| style="text-align:left;" | Code Red
| style="text-align:left;" | "I Gave You Everything"
| style="text-align:left;" | Deni Lew, Nicky Graham, Wayne Hector
| Advanced
|-
| 3
| style="text-align:left;" | Esseness
| style="text-align:left;" | "I Never Knew"
| style="text-align:left;" | Stuart Elliot, Rick Driscoll, Mike Connaris
| Eliminated
|-
| 4
| style="text-align:left;" | Dan Anderson
| style="text-align:left;" | "Sometimes It Rains"
| style="text-align:left;" | Louisa Scott, Ronnie James Scott
| Eliminated
|-
| 5
| style="text-align:left;" | Lois
| style="text-align:left;" | "I Just Want To Make Love 2 U"
| style="text-align:left;" | Ben Keen, Paul Thompson, Mike Connaris
| Eliminated
|-
| 6
| style="text-align:left;" | Twin Hazey
| style="text-align:left;" | "Louise"
| style="text-align:left;" | Keith Summers, David Whitehouse, Michael Flaherty
| Eliminated
|- style="font-weight:bold; background:#FFDEAD;"
| 7
| style="text-align:left;" | Zeitia Massiah
| style="text-align:left;" | "A Little Love"
| style="text-align:left;" | Pam Sheyne, Eliot Kennedy
| Advanced
|- style="font-weight:bold; background:#FFDEAD;"
| 8
| style="text-align:left;" | Gina G
| style="text-align:left;" | "Ooh Aah... Just a Little Bit"
| style="text-align:left;" | Steve Rodway, Simon Tauber
| Advanced
|}

Final
The final was held on 8 March 1996 at BBC Television Centre. Hosted by Terry Wogan, it was broadcast on BBC1 at 20:00. For the first time since 1985, there was no simultaneous broadcast with BBC Radio 2. The winning entry was announced at the end of the show following a further public phone vote. The guest performers were Irish boy band Boyzone, who performed their version of Cat Stevens' "Father and Son" and actress Nicola Hughes who performed "The Acid Queen" from the rock musical The Who's Tommy''.

At Eurovision
With the exception of host nation Norway, who were exempted, all 29 countries wishing to participate in the 1996 contest had to go through an audio-only pre-qualifying round held on 20 March. The lowest-placed seven songs would be eliminated and would not appear in Oslo. Gina G was placed third with 153 points, thus qualifying for the final.

On the night of the final Gina G performed 2nd in the running order, following Turkey and preceding Spain. At the end of the voting it had received 77 points, placing 8th out of 23 contestants. The United Kingdom jury awarded its 12 points to Cyprus.

When Belén Fernández de Henestrosa, the Spanish spokesperson, announced the votes of the Spanish jury, she awarded six points to "Holland" (the Netherlands), which host Ingvild Byrn misheard as "Poland." The official results table corrected this error, and the Netherlands' seventh-place result was restored at the expense of the United Kingdom, who ultimately finished eighth. 
Despite this result, 'Just a Little Bit' is one of the most successful of the UK's entries at Eurovision, not only topping the UK singles chart but also finding success in America, where the song was nominated for the Grammy Award for Best Dance Recording in 1998.

Voting

Qualifying round

Final

References

1996
Countries in the Eurovision Song Contest 1996
Eurovision
Eurovision